Shimada Seamount is a seamount in the Pacific Ocean located southwest of Baja California Sur in Mexico. Talus deposits surround the seamount at its base. Volcanic rocks taken from Shimada are considered to be icelandites.

Most seamounts form at mid-ocean ridges, but hotspots and transform faults can also produce seamounts. These mechanisms cannot really explain the origin of Shimada Seamount, however; it may be part of a hotspot trace. Evidence from core samples around the seamount, the appearance of the summit area, and the presence of thin manganese crusts imply an age of about 10,000 years for some volcanic rocks at Shimada; the rocks are too young to be dated by potassium-argon dating, and all the evidence indicates that volcanic activity at Shimada is of late Quaternary-Holocene age.

Shimada Seamount is named for the American fisheries scientist Bell M. Shimada (1922–1958). It has been known under a variety of names throughout its history, including Shimada Bank, Shamada Seamount, Hurricane Bank and Allaire Bank.

See also 

 Henderson Seamount
 Vesteris Seamount

References

Sources

External links 
 earthref.org Seamount Catalog: Shimada Seamount

Seamounts of the Pacific Ocean
Quaternary volcanoes
Undersea banks of the Pacific Ocean